Tornaszentjakab is a village in Borsod-Abaúj-Zemplén county, Hungary.

Sightseeings
The old church of the village had been built probably in the 12th century in romanesque style. As in the case of the Vizsoly church a western nave was built to it in the next century in gothic style. On the southern wall of the romanesque nave three small windows open. There is the old doorway, too. There is a doorway on the gothic nave too.

In the diary of visitors, in 1746 the church belonged to the Reformed Church. later it was given back to the Roman Catholic Church. At that time has the tower been built.

External links 
 Street map 

Populated places in Borsod-Abaúj-Zemplén County
Romanesque architecture in Hungary